Acontiola is a genus of moths of the family Noctuidae. The genus was described by Staudinger in 1900.

It is considered by Butterflies and Moths of the World to be a synonym of Ozarba Walker, 1865.

Species
Acontiola acclivis (Felder & Rogenhofer, 1874) South Africa, Namibia
Acontiola binorbis (Hampson, 1910) South Africa, Zimbabwe
Acontiola boursini (Berio, 1940) Somalia, Ethiopia
Acontiola chryseiplaga (Hampson, 1910) Zaire
Acontiola cryptochrysea (Hampson, 1902) Madagascar, Mozambique, South Africa
Acontiola cyanopasta (Hampson, 1910) South Africa, Namibia
Acontiola densa (Walker, 1865) South Africa, Namibia
Acontiola diplogramma (Hampson, 1902) South Africa
Acontiola divisa (Gaede, 1916) Tanzania
Acontiola epimochla (Bethune-Baker, 1911) Nigeria
Acontiola festiva (Berio, 1950) South Africa
Acontiola gobabis (Berio, 1940) Zaire, ..., Namibia
Acontiola heliastis (Hampson, 1902) Arabia, Somalia, Eritrea, Ethiopia, Kenya, Uganda, Malawi, Tanzania, Botswana, Zambia, Zimbabwe, South Africa, Namibia, Gambia, Cameroon
Acontiola hemichrysea (Hampson, 1910) Zaire
Acontiola hypoxantha (Wallengren, 1860) Kenya, Uganda, Mozambique, Zimbabwe, South Africa, Namibia
Acontiola implicata (Berio, 1940) Tanzania, South Africa
Acontiola incognita (Berio, 1954) Madagascar
Acontiola lascivalis (Lederer, 1855) south-eastern Europe
Acontiola metachrysea (Hampson, 1910) Zimbabwe
Acontiola moldavicola (Herrich-Schäffer, [1851]) south-eastern Europe, Iraq
Acontiola parvula (Berio, 1940) Somalia, Ethiopia
Acontiola punctithorax (Berio, 1940) South Africa
Acontiola rosescens (Hampson, 1910) eastern Zaire, Uganda, Burundi, Kenya
Acontiola ruperti Behounek & Speidel, 2015 Zambia
Acontiola sancta Staudinger, 1900 Lebanon, Palestine, Iran, Arabia, Chad, Sudan, Somalia, Kenya, Tanzania, Namibia
Acontiola separabilis (Berio, 1940) Eritrea, South Africa
Acontiola subterminalis (Hampson, 1910) Kenya, Botswana, Zimbabwe, Zambia, South Africa
Acontiola subtilimba (Berio, 1963) Mauritania, eastern Zaire, Uganda, Kenya
Acontiola varia (Walker, 1865) Yemen, Kenya, Botswana, Zimbabwe, South Africa, Namibia, Angola
Acontiola vultuosa (Distant, 1898) Zimbabwe, Mozambique, South Africa

References

Acontiinae
Noctuoidea genera